Bondarevskoye is a rural locality (a selo) in Kosyakinsky Selsoviet, Kizlyarsky District, Republic of Dagestan, Russia. The population was 507 as of 2010. There are 5 streets.

Geography 
Bondarevskoye is located 12 km northwest of Kizlyar (the district's administrative centre) by road. Mikheyevskoye and Novogeorgiyevka are the nearest rural localities.

Nationalities 
Dargins, Avars and Russians live there.

References 

Rural localities in Kizlyarsky District